The men's 110 metres hurdles event at the 2009 Asian Athletics Championships was held at the Guangdong Olympic Stadium on November 10–11.

Medalists

Results

Heats
Wind: Heat 1: +0.3 m/s, Heat 2: -0.2 m/s

Final
Wind: -0.1 m/s

References
Heats results
Final results

2009 Asian Athletics Championships
Sprint hurdles at the Asian Athletics Championships